Neral Junction is a railway station on the Central line of the Mumbai Suburban Railway network located in the town of Neral. It is a junction railway station between Kalyan - Karjat section of Central railway connecting Mumbai and Pune.  It is the starting point of the narrow gauge Matheran Hill Railway connecting the hill station of Matheran.

Gallery

References 

Railway stations in Raigad district
Mumbai Suburban Railway stations
Mumbai CR railway division
Kalyan-Lonavala rail line